Chelmsford Radio 107.7 was a local radio station for Chelmsford and mid Essex, broadcasting from studios in Southend, and owned by the Adventure Radio Group. It merged with Southend Radio in 2015 to create Radio Essex.

History 

Chelmsford Radio began broadcasting as Chelmer FM in 1998, under the ownership of Mid Essex Radio Ltd. In September 2001, the station was purchased by the Tindle Radio Group — owner of Dream 100 in Colchester — and rebranded as Dream 107.7 in mid-February 2002.

In September 2008 the station was sold by Tindle to Adventure Radio, the then owners of Mercury 96.6 and Southend Radio, with whom Ofcom approved a co-location arrangement for Dream to move its studios to the Southend complex. On 2 February 2009 the station re-launched as Chelmsford Radio.  Chelmsford Radio shared its programming and resources with Southend Radio as well as Connect FM in Peterborough and Northamptonshire.
 
The 'Essex Action' feature was a community service designed to help local groups and charities with publicity and also with appeals for volunteers. The service was coordinated by the Southend Association of Volunteers (SAVS) with their counterparts across the county contributing items for broadcast.

On 6 June 2013 Chelmsford Radio and sister station Southend Radio launched on DAB under the singular service Radio Essex. The original DAB only Radio Essex was broadcast on the Essex DAB mux and could be heard in many places across the county where Chelmsford Radio couldn't, including Harlow, Colchester, and Sudbury (Suffolk).

In February 2015 it was announced that Chelmsford Radio, along with Southend Radio and Radio Essex, would be relaunched as one single station known as Radio Essex. The new station launched on 23 March 2015 on 105.1 FM, 107.7 FM, and on DAB.

Slogans 

"Just Great Songs for Essex"

Technical 
Chelmsford Radio was broadcast on 107.7 MHz from a mobile phone mast at Church Green in the village Danbury. Before 2002 the station output was broadcast from a transmitter close to the A414 in Danbury.

The 107.7 signal could be received as far away as Basildon, Ongar, Braintree and Colchester.

See also
 Radio Essex
 Connect Radio 106.8
 Connect Radio 97.2 & 107.4
 Mercury 96.6
 Southend Radio

External links
 Chelmsford Radio
 Media UK
  History of local radio in Essex
 Radio in Essex
 Danbury Church Green transmitter
 Radio Today - Southend and Chelmsford Radio to merge

Radio stations in Essex
Radio stations established in 1998
City of Chelmsford